Lime is an unincorporated community and ghost town in Baker County, Oregon, United States,  north of Huntington on U.S. Route 30/Interstate 84. It is near the confluence of Marble Creek and the Burnt River on the Union Pacific Railroad. The Oregon Trail passes through Lime.

History
The Lime post office was established in 1899.  The deposits of limestone in the area were manufactured into lime that supplied a large area of Eastern Oregon and western Idaho. The Acme Cement Plaster Company built a plant at Lime in 1916 to produce plaster. The Sun Portland Cement Company bought the plant in 1921 and built another facility for producing Portland cement. In 1926, the company merged with Oregon Portland Cement Company from Portland; by the 1960s, the Lime facility produced 1,200,000 barrels a year. In 1940, the community at its peak had a population of 18. The town began to decline when the post office closed in 1964.

As the nearby limestone deposits were depleted, limestone was brought from the Nelson area near Durkee. A new plant was built at Nelson in 1979 and the facility at Lime was closed in 1980. Oregon Portland Cement Company merged with the Ash Grove Cement Company in 1983.

In 1999, Baker County took possession of the site of the closed factory for back taxes. In 2018, the plant was scheduled for demolition. Demolition crews arrived in Lime in April 2018 to begin the work.

See also 

 Abandoned village
 Cement, California
 List of ghost towns by country
 List of ghost towns in Oregon

References

External links

Images of abandoned cement plant at Lime from Flickr

Populated places established in the 1890s
Unincorporated communities in Baker County, Oregon
1899 establishments in Oregon
Populated places established in 1899
Unincorporated communities in Oregon
Cement industry